Allen Mountain is located in Essex County, New York. It is part of the Marcy Group of the Great Range of the Adirondack Mountains, and is flanked to the north by Mount Skylight.

The south side of Allen Mountain drains into White Lily Brook, thence into the Boreas Ponds, the Boreas River, the Hudson River, and into New York Bay.
The southwest side drains into Dudley Brook, thence into the Opalescent River, and the Hudson River.
The northwest side drains into Allen Brook, thence into Skylight Brook, and Dudley Brook.
The northeast side drains into Marcy Brook, thence into Stillwater Inlet, Upper Ausable Lake, and the Ausable River, which drains into Lake Champlain, and ultimately into Canada's Gulf of Saint Lawrence.
The east side drains into Sand Brook, and thence into Stillwater Inlet.

Allen Mountain is in the High Peaks Wilderness Area of Adirondack State Park and was named for Frederick B. Allen (1840–1925) in 1869.

Many experienced hikers in the area consider Allen Mountain to be the most difficult to climb of the 46 Adirondack High Peaks.

See also 
 List of mountains of New York
 Northeast 111 4,000-footers
 Adirondack High Peaks
 Adirondack Forty-Sixers

References

External links 
 

Mountains of Essex County, New York
Adirondack High Peaks
Mountains of New York (state)